Abdul Jabbar Jomard (‎; December 1909 in Mosul – November 30, 1971 in Mosul ) was Iraqi Foreign Minister  from 1958 to 1959.

References

1909 births
1971 deaths
Iraqi diplomats
Foreign ministers of Iraq
People from Mosul